Caroline Jane Gardner   was the Auditor General for Scotland between June 2012 and July 2020. She is a former president of Chartered Institute of Public Finance and Accountancy (CIPFA) 2006−7.

Career
Gardiner is originally from London. She studied for her CIPFA exams while working as a trainee accountant at the Wolverhampton Borough council. She moved to Edinburgh in 1995, taking up the post of director of health and social work studies at the Accounts Commission. When Audit Scotland was created in 2000, she became the deputy auditor general.

She was a member of the CIPFA Council since 2000. She was the chair of CIPFA in Scotland in 2001−2002. She became CIPFA's 116th president, from June 2006 to June 2007.

She was seconded as the chief financial officer of the Turks and Caicos Islands in 2010. After this she spent a short period freelancing.

In March 2012, the Scottish Parliament decided that Caroline Gardner should succeed Robert Black. In July she took up the position of Auditor General, and Accountable Officer for Audit Scotland. She was succeed in the role by Stephen Boyle in July 2020.

Honours
In March 2016, Gardner was elected a Fellow of the Royal Society of Edinburgh, Scotland's National Academy for science and letters.

She was appointed Commander of the Order of the British Empire (CBE) in the 2021 New Year Honours for services to the Scottish public sector.

References

External links
 profile at Audit Scotland website

Year of birth missing (living people)
Living people
Scottish accountants
Women chief financial officers
Civil servants from London
Political office-holders in Scotland
Scottish economists
British women economists
Financial economists
Commanders of the Order of the British Empire